This is a table of selected pistol/submachine gun and rifle/machine gun cartridges by common name. Data values are the highest found for the cartridge, and might not occur in the same load (e.g. the highest muzzle energy might not be in the same load as the highest muzzle velocity, since the bullet weights can differ between loads).

Legend 
 Factory loadings.  Number of manufacturers currently producing complete cartridges - e.g. Norma, RWS, Hornady, Winchester, Federal, Remington, Sellier & Bellot, Prvi Partizan.  May be none for obsolete and wildcat cartridges.
 H/R: Handgun (H) or rifle (R) - dominant usage of the cartridge (although several dual-purpose cartridges exist)
 Size: Metric size - may not be official
 MV: Muzzle velocity, in feet-per-second
 ME: Muzzle energy, in foot-pounds
 P: Momentum, in pound (force) (lbf) times seconds.  A guide to the recoil from the cartridge, and an indicator of bullet penetration potential.  The .30-06 Springfield (at 2.064 lbf-s) is considered the upper limit for tolerable recoil for inexperienced rifle shooters.
 Chg: Propellant charge, in grains
 Dia: Bullet diameter, in inches
 BC: Ballistic coefficient, G1 model
 L: Case length (mm)

See also 
 Firearm
 History of the firearm
 Physics of firearms
 Terminal ballistics
 External ballistics
 Internal ballistics
 Stopping power
 Hydrostatic shock
 Point-blank range

References

External links 
 Terminal Ballistics Research: Detailed history and terminal performance discussion for numerous hunting cartridges, organized by bullet diameter.

Cartridges pistol and rifle
handgun and rifle